Spilaethalida turbida is a moth of the family Erebidae first described by Arthur Gardiner Butler in 1882.

It is endemic to Papua New Guinea, the Bismarck Archipelago, the D'Entrecasteaux Islands, the Trobriand Islands, and the Woodlark Islands.

Subspecies
Spilaethalida turbida turbida (Bismarck Archipelago)
Spilaethalida turbida sordidior (Rothschild, 1910) (Papua New Guinea, D'Entrecasteaux Islands)
Spilaethalida turbida meeki (Druce, 1899) (Trobriand Islands)
Spilaethalida turbida woodlarkiana (Rothschild, 1910) (Woodlark Islands)

References

Spilosomina
Endemic fauna of Papua New Guinea
Moths of Papua New Guinea
Bismarck Archipelago
D'Entrecasteaux Islands
Trobriand Islands
Moths described in 1882